Ballabur is a village in the municipality of Şağlakücə in the Lankaran Rayon of Azerbaijan.

References

Populated places in Lankaran District